Victoria Catlin (born Victoria Shechter on September 23, 1952) is a retired actress best known for her roles as Blackie O'Reilly in Twin Peaks, Ellen Forrest in Maniac Cop, Dr. Catherine Peake in Howling V: The Rebirth, and Anastasia in Ghoulies.

Career 

She is best known for her roles as Blackie O'Reilly, the madam of One-Eyed Jacks, in Twin Peaks, Ellen Forrest (wife of Bruce Campbell's character) in Maniac Cop, Dr. Catherine Peake in Howling V: The Rebirth, and Anastasia in Ghoulies. She was also in Mutant on the Bounty.

She additionally appeared in the movies Slow Burn and Maid to Order, and in the TV shows Amazing Stories and Adam-12.

Filmography

Film

Television

References

External links
 

Living people
American film actresses
American television actresses
1952 births
21st-century American women